Browne Lake Provincial Park is a provincial park in British Columbia, Canada, located 22 km east-southeast of Kelowna in the Okanagan Highland, near Big White Ski Resort and between the heads of Hydraulic and Grouse Creeks.

The park was established in 2004 by Order-in-Council, to protect the Interior Douglas-fir-Montane Spruce transition forest.

Browne Lake Ecological Reserve, comprising 114 hectares, lies to its northwest, and had been established in 1973, to protect a wet meadow ecosystem and surrounding forest in the Interior Cedar Hemlock zone.

References

Provincial parks of British Columbia
Monashee Mountains
Provincial parks in the Okanagan
2004 establishments in British Columbia
Protected areas established in 2004